UEFA club competitions are the set of club tournaments organised by the Union of European Football Associations (UEFA), generally in professional and amateur association football and futsal. The term was established in 1971 by the confederation to differentiate the men's football competitions under its administration, the first in history being held at a pan-European stage, from other international competitions carried out in the continent between 1960s and 1990s, such as the Inter-Cities Fairs Cup, International Football Cup and Karl Rappan Cup, Cup of the Alps, Balkans Cup and the restructured Mitropa Cup (as well as some which had already been discontinued by late 1950s such as the Latin Cup). All these tournaments were organised by private bodies and/or at least two national associations and concerning one of more regional areas of Europe, not being recognised by UEFA for historic-statistical purposes.

After being recognised by FIFA in 1961 and defined its functions as governing body, UEFA laid down principles for the authorisation of other international club competitions, becoming the only organization with legal authority over international football in the continent. For that reason, it considers only results in its own competitions, in general terms and by single tournament, as the only valid for calculating and communicating confederation-level official records and statistics as long as setting combined values in inter-club football.

Until the first UEFA Europa Conference League final in 2022, the only team to have won every men's professional club competition was Juventus of Italy. FC Barcelona of Spain became the first women's club to follow its men's team of winning the Champions League, by winning the 2021 Women's Champions League Final. The club's men's team won their first title in 1992. The beaten finalists Chelsea of England was also seeking to break that record as well, as its men's team won their maiden in 2012. They were already the first club ever to see its men's and women's teams reach the Champions League final in the same season, having qualified for the Champions League Final as well. Barcelona is also the only club in the UEFA zone that has won men's and women's Champions League, the Youth League and the Futsal Champions League among these with active sections which can compete in all these tournaments.

Main tournaments

UEFA Champions League 

The UEFA Champions League (abbreviated as UCL, or sometimes, UEFA CL) is an annual club football competition organised by the Union of European Football Associations (UEFA) and contested by top-division European clubs, deciding the competition winners through a round robin group stage to qualify for a double-legged knockout format, and a single leg final. It is one of the most prestigious football tournaments in the world and the most prestigious club competition in European football, played by the national league champions (and, for some nations, one or more runners-up) of their national associations.

The competition took on its current name in 1992, adding a round-robin group stage in 1991 and allowing multiple entrants from certain countries since the 1997–98 season. It has since been expanded, and while most of Europe's national leagues can still only enter their champion, the strongest leagues now provide up to four teams. Clubs that finish next-in-line in their national league, having not qualified for the Champions League, are eligible for the second-tier UEFA Europa League competition, and since 2021, for the third-tier UEFA Europa Conference League.

UEFA Europa League 

The UEFA Europa League (abbreviated as UEL, or sometimes, UEFA EL), formerly the UEFA Cup, is an annual football club competition organised since 1971 by the Union of European Football Associations (UEFA) for eligible European football clubs. It is the second-tier competition of European club football, ranking below the UEFA Champions League and above the UEFA Europa Conference League. The UEFA Cup was the third-tier competition from 1971 to 1999 before the UEFA Cup Winners' Cup was discontinued, and it is still often referred to as the “C3” in reference of this. Clubs qualify for the competition based on their performance in their national leagues and cup competitions.

Introduced in 1971 as the UEFA Cup, it replaced the Inter-Cities Fairs Cup. In 1999, the UEFA Cup Winners' Cup was merged with the UEFA Cup and discontinued as a separate competition. From the 2004–05 season a group stage was added before the knockout phase. The competition has been known as the Europa League since the 2009–10 season, following a change in format. The 2009 re-branding included a merge with the UEFA Intertoto Cup, producing an enlarged competition format, with an expanded group stage and a change in qualifying criteria. The winner of the UEFA Europa League qualifies for the UEFA Super Cup and, since the 2014–15 season, qualifies for the following season's UEFA Champions League, entering at the group stage.

UEFA Europa Conference League 

The UEFA Europa Conference League (abbreviated as UECL) is an annual football club competition organised by the Union of European Football Associations (UEFA) for eligible European football clubs. Clubs qualify for the competition based on their performance in their national leagues and cup competitions. It is the third tier of active European club football competitions, after the Champions League and the Europa League.

First contested in the 2021–22 season, the competition serves as the bottom level of the Europa League, which was reduced from 48 to 32 teams in the group stage. The competition is primarily contested by teams from lower-ranked UEFA member associations. No teams qualify directly to the group stage, with 10 teams eliminated in the Europa League play-offs and the rest coming from the Europa Conference League qualifiers. The winners of the competition are awarded a position in the Europa League the following season, unless they qualify for the Champions League.

See also 

 UEFA competitions

References 

 
UEFA